Ondrej Krištofík (born 10 September 1966) is a Slovak retired football player. He played for ŠK Slovan Bratislava, FC Spartak Trnava and SK Slavia Praha. He won the Czech league title with Slavia. He earned seven caps for the Slovakia national football team.

International career
Krištofík made six appearances for the full Czechoslovakia national football team, his debut coming in a friendly against Australia on 30 January 1991.

References

External links
 

1966 births
Living people
Czechoslovak footballers
Slovak footballers
Czechoslovakia international footballers
Slovakia international footballers
Association football midfielders
ŠK Slovan Bratislava players
SK Slavia Prague players
Hapoel Petah Tikva F.C. players
Slovak Super Liga players
Liga Leumit players
Expatriate footballers in Israel
Expatriate footballers in the Czech Republic
Slovak expatriate sportspeople in Israel
Slovak expatriate sportspeople in the Czech Republic
Dual internationalists (football)
Footballers from Bratislava